Brecknockshire, also known as the County of Brecknock, Breconshire, or the County of Brecon is one of thirteen historic counties of Wales, and a former administrative county. Named after its county town of Brecon (archaically "Brecknock"), the county is mountainous and primarily rural.

Geography
Brecknockshire is bounded to the north by Radnorshire, to the east by Herefordshire and Monmouthshire, to the south by Monmouthshire and Glamorgan, and to the west by Carmarthenshire and Cardiganshire.  The county is predominantly rural and mountainous. The Black Mountains occupy the southeast of the area, the Brecon Beacons the central region, Fforest Fawr the southwest and Mynydd Epynt the north. The highest point is Pen y Fan, 2907 ft (886 m). The River Wye traces nearly the whole of the northern boundary, and the Usk flows in an easterly direction through the central valley. The main towns are Brecon, Beaufort, Brynmawr, Builth Wells, Crickhowell, Hay-on-Wye, Llanelly, Llanwrtyd Wells, Rassau, Talgarth, Vaynor and Ystradgynlais.

History
The County of Brecknock was created by the Laws in Wales Act 1535 from the combined area of the medieval Welsh kingdom of Brycheiniog and the cantref of Buellt.

Brecknockshire had a population of 55,603 by 1841.

Brycheiniog
Brycheiniog was an independent kingdom in South Wales in the Early Middle Ages. It often acted as a buffer state between England to the east and the powerful south Welsh kingdom of Deheubarth to the west. This kingdom formed the southern part of today’s Brecknockshire. The county’s Welsh name (Sir Frycheiniog – the shire of Brycheiniog) is derived from the kingdom’s name.

The exact origins of Brycheiniog are unclear but the name is thought to derive from Brychan mac Anlach, the 5th century ruler of the area. The lands of his kingdom supposedly formed a dowry from his father-in-law Tewdrig ap Teithfallt. Over the succeeding centuries many dynasties ruled the kingdom, alliances were made and broken, victories won and defeats suffered, but the kingdom maintained its integrity and identity up to Norman times.

Cantref of Buellt
Buellt or Builth was a cantref in medieval Wales, located west of the River Wye. Unlike most cantrefs, it was not part of any of the major Welsh kingdoms for most of its history, but was instead ruled by an autonomous local dynasty. During the Norman invasion of Wales, the Marcher Lord Philip de Braose conquered Buellt around 1095. The area then changed hands between multiple Norman and Welsh figures. In November 1282, Edward I overran Buellt as part of his final conquest of Wales and the cantref became a crown possession.

Lordship of Brecknock
Bernard de Neufmarché was a minor Norman lord who rose to power in the Welsh Marches before successfully undertaking the invasion and conquest of the Kingdom of Brycheiniog between 1088 and 1095. Bernard established a Marcher Lordship in its place – the Lordship of Brecknock.

The lordship was ruled by numerous families over the next 400 years. By the early Tudor period, it was ruled by the Earls of Buckingham. When Edward Stafford, 3rd Duke of Buckingham, was executed for treason, having been suspected of plotting against King Henry VIII, the Lordship was forfeited to the crown. Henry VIII combined it with the cantref of Buellt.

By his Laws in Wales Acts, Henry converted the combined territory - the Lordships of Brecknock and Buellt - into Brecknockshire, subject to standard English law.

Creation of county
The Laws in Wales Act 1535 created the County of Brecknock by combining a number of "lordships, towns, parishes, commotes and cantreds" in the "Country or Dominion of Wales". The areas combined were:
"Brekenoke" (Brecknock),  "Crekehowell" (Crickhowell) "Tretowre",  "Penkelly",  "Englisshe Talgarth",  "Welsshe Talgarth",  "Dynas",  "The Haye" (Hay-on-Wye), "Glynebogh", "Broynlles" (Bronllys),  "Cantercely" (Cantref Selyf), "Llando Blaynllynby", "Estrodewe", "Buelthe" (Builth), and "Llangors". The town of Brecknock or Brecon was declared the county town.

The county was divided into six hundreds in 1542: Builth, Crickhowell, Devynnock, Merthyr, Penkelly, and Talgarth. Brecknock was the only borough in the county. Other market towns were Builth, Crickhowell and Hay-on-Wye.  Under the terms of the 1535 legislation one member of parliament was returned for the borough and one for the county.

Governance

Current local government
Most of Brecknockshire lies within the principal area of Powys. A significant area in the south of the county lies in other principal areas. An area around Penderyn lies in Rhondda Cynon Taff. An area including Cefn-coed-y-cymmer, Llwyn-on, Pontsticill, Vaynor and Trefechan lies in Merthyr Tydfil. A small area including Princetown and Llechryd lies in Caerphilly. A large area including Beaufort, Trefil, Rassau and Brynmawr lies in Blaenau Gwent. Another large area including Clydach, Llanelly and Gilwern lies in the principal area of Monmouthshire.

History of local government

Under the Local Government Act 1888, an elected county council was formed for an administrative county which differed slightly from the historic county, with a number of industrialised areas in the south of the county (Beaufort, Dukestown, Llechryd and Rassau) falling under the new administrative county of Monmouth.

The county council held its meetings at Brecon Shire Hall, which had been built in 1842. The county council's main offices were at Watton Mount, a large house directly opposite the shire hall, until 1962 when New County Hall was built immediately behind the shire hall. Following the local government reorganisation in 1974, the New County Hall became an area office for Powys County Council and also served as offices for the Brecon Beacons National Park Authority for some years, but was demolished in 2016.

Under the Public Health Act 1848 and the Local Government Act 1858 a number of towns were created Local Board Districts or Local Government Districts respectively, with local boards to govern their areas. In 1875 these, along with the Borough of Brecknock, became urban sanitary districts. At the same time the remainder of the county was divided into rural sanitary districts, some of which crossed county boundaries. The Local Government Act 1894 redesignated these as urban and rural districts. Two civil parishes were administered by rural district councils in neighbouring counties until 1934.

Coat of arms
On establishment in 1889 the Brecknockshire County Council adopted the attributed arms of Brychan, fifth century founder of Brycheiniog. The shield was quartered. In the first and fourth quarters were the purported arms of Brychan's father Anlach: sable a fess cotised or between two swords in pale argent hilted gold, the upper sword point-upwards, the lower point-downwards. In the second and third quarters were arms representing Brychan's mother, Marchell: or, three reremice (bats) 2 and 1 azure. The motto Undeb Hedd Llywddiant or "Unity, Peace, Prosperity" was used with the arms. The supposed fifth-century arms were invented in the Middle Ages, heraldry having not developed until several centuries later. The county council did not obtain an official grant of armorial bearings, although the unofficial arms subsequently became the basis for those granted to the successor Brecknock Borough Council.

Legacy
The administrative county of Brecknock was abolished in 1974 by the Local Government Act 1972. The bulk of its area passed to the newly formed Powys, where it became the Brecknock District, one of three districts. At the same time the parishes of Penderyn and Vaynor went instead to the Cynon Valley and Merthyr Tydfil districts in Mid Glamorgan, whilst the urban district of Brynmawr and the parish of Llanelly from Crickhowell Rural District became part of Blaenau Gwent.

In 1996 a further reorganisation of local government took place in Wales, and Powys became a unitary authority. Powys County Council established a Brecknockshire "shire committee" consisting of councillors elected for electoral divisions within the former Borough of Brecknock. According to the 2001 census the area covered by the shire committee had a population of 42,075. The county council abolished its shire committees in 2018.

Culture and community
The Brecknockshire Agricultural Society, established in 1755, is the oldest continuous such society in Great Britain. The society organises the Brecon County Show, held annually on the 1st Saturday in August at The Showground, Watton, Brecon.

Brecknock Young Farmers has 13 clubs throughout the county. It is affiliated to the National Federation of Young Farmers Clubs.

Brecknock Society and Museum Friends (Welsh: Cymdeithas Brycheiniog a Chyfeillion yr Amgueddfa), found in 1928, is a historical society that promotes "the study and understanding of the Archaeology, History, Geology, Natural History, the Arts and Literature of Wales, especially the historic county of Brecknock." The organization has published the historical journal Brycheiniog since 1955. It is closely associated with funding and running the Y Gaer.

The Brecon Jazz Festival has been held annually since 1984. Normally staged in early August, it has played host to a range of jazz musicians from across the world. A Brecon Fringe Festival organises alternative free music in pubs, hotels, galleries and cafes in the town.

Hay-on-Wye is a destination for bibliophiles in the United Kingdom, with two dozen bookshops, many selling specialist and second-hand books. Richard Booth opened his first shop there in 1962, and by the 1970s Hay had gained the nickname "The Town of Books".

The Hay Festival of Literature and the Arts is a major event in the British cultural calendar. Devised by Norman, Rhoda and Peter Florence in 1988, the festival runs for ten days from May to June. It was described by Bill Clinton in 2001 as "The Woodstock of the mind".

Transport

Road
The A40 London-West Wales trunk road passes in an east-west direction through the county, entering near Glangrwyney, passing through Crickhowell, by-passing Brecon, leaving the county after passing through Trecastle.  The A483 Swansea-Manchester trunk road passes through the north-west, entering south of Llanwrtyd Wells and leaving north of Builth Wells. The A470 Cardiff-Glan Conway trunk road enters the county north of Merthyr Tydfil and, after by-passing Brecon, hugs the eastern border until it leaves the county when it crosses the River Wye at Builth Wells. The A465 (Heads of the Valleys Road) winds in and out of the county, following its southern borders with Monmouthshire and Glamorgan.

Rail
The Heart of Wales line runs from Cravens Arms in Shropshire to Llanelli in Carmarthenshire. It follows a similar route to the A483 through the north of the county, with stops at Sugar Loaf, Llanwrtyd Wells, Llangammarch Wells, Garth and Cilmeri. Builth Road Station to the north of Builth Wells is situated in Radnorshire. The south of the county once had an extensive rail network with connections through Glamorgan and Monmouthshire to Neath, Merthyr Tydfil, Cardiff, Newport and thence to the main Great Western main line. The Brecon Mountain Railway is a 1 ft 11 3⁄4 in (603 mm) narrow gauge tourist railway on the south side of the Brecon Beacons. It climbs northwards from Pant (in Glamorgan) along the full length of the Pontsticill Reservoir (also called 'Taf Fechan' reservoir by Welsh Water) and continues past the adjoining Pentwyn reservoir to Torpantau.

Cycling
The National Cycle Route 8, which runs from Cardiff to Holyhead, passes through the county. From Cefn-coed-y-cymmer to Brecon this follows the Taff Trail.

Canal
The Monmouthshire and Brecon Canal ran from Brecon to Newport. It was completed at the start of the nineteenth century but closed in 1962.  The route from Brecon to Abergavenny has since been re-opened. 35 miles are currently navigable, most of them running through the Brecon Beacons.

Religious sites
St Mary's Church, Brecon is a Grade II* listed building. The structure was originally a chapel of ease for the priory. The 90 feet (27 m) West Tower dates to 1510 and is attributed to Edward, Duke of Buckingham. The eight bells date to 1750.

The Cathedral Church of St John the Evangelist is the cathedral of the Diocese of Swansea and Brecon in the Church in Wales. The cathedral is thought to be on the site of an earlier Celtic church, of which no trace remains. A new church, dedicated to St. John, was built on the orders of Bernard de Neufmarché.

St David's Church, Llanfaes referred to locally as Llanfaes Church, was probably founded in the early sixteenth century. It is probable that the site and the name of the present Church were chosen because of the close proximity of a fresh water well called Ffynnon Dewi (David's Well) which was situated approximately 150 metres south of the church.

Plough Lane Chapel, Brecon, also known as Plough United Reformed Church, is a Grade II* listed building. The present building dates back to 1841 and was re-modelled by Owen Morris Roberts and is considered to be one of the finest chapel interiors in Wales.

The Church of St Elli, Llanelly  is dedicated to the 6th-century Saint Elli, who may have been a daughter or granddaughter of King Brychan. The church dates from the 14th century, or earlier, but little remains of this period. The nave is medieval but its walls were all rebuilt in the restorations of the 19th and 20th centuries.

St Mary's Church, Hay-on-Wye consists of a nave and chancel with a square embattled tower at the west end. Separated by a deep dingle, which probably was formerly a moat, it is situated westward of the town upon an almost precipitous eminence, near to the River Wye.

St Edmund's Church, Crickhowell is a Grade II* listed building built in the early 14th century.  It has the only shingled spire in the county.

The Church of St Issui, Partrishow dates from 1060. The existing building was mainly constructed in the 14th and 15th centuries. The church is most famous for its rood screen which dates from 1500. It is a Grade I listed building.

St David's parish church, Llanddew is one of the oldest churches in Brecknockshire. The building dates from around the 13th century and has a cruciform shape, with a central tower.

Sport
Brecon Rugby Football Club (Welsh: Clwb Rygbi Aberhonddu) was one of the eleven founding members of the Welsh Rugby Union in 1881. It is a feeder club for the Cardiff Blues. The club plays at Parc De Pugh, Brecon.

Gwernyfed Rugby Football Club is based in Talgarth. It is a feeder club for the Cardiff Blues. Gwernyfed RFC was founded in 1965 by two school teachers from Gwernyfed High School.

The county has four football clubs: Talgath Town FC, Brecon Corinthians AFC, Brecon Northcote FC and Builth Wells FC. All play in the Welsh football league system.

The county has four clubs affiliated to the Welsh Bowling Association: at Brecon, Talgarth, Builth Wells and Hay on-Wye.

Brecon Leisure Centre at Penlan has a swimming pool, gymnasium, ten-pin bowling and a climbing wall. It is the headquarters of Brecon Hockey Club and of Brecon Athletics Club. Crickhowell Community Sports Centre has indoor and outdoor sports facilities and is a conference venue. Builth Wells Sports Centre and Swimming Pool provides facilities in the north of the county. The Gwernyfed and Hay Leisure Centre at Three Cocks has a fitness suite, sports hall and multi-purpose floodlit pitch.

Notable people
Thomas Coke (b. Brecon 9 September 1747 – d. at sea 2 May 1814) was the first Methodist bishop and is known as the Father of Methodist Missions.

Sarah Siddons (née Kemble) (b. Brecon 5 July 1755 – d. London 8 June 1831), actress, was the best-known tragedienne of the 18th century.

Richard Booth (b. Hay-on-Wye 12 September 1938), bookseller, known for his contribution to the success of Hay-on-Wye as a centre for second-hand bookselling. He is also the self-proclaimed "King of Hay".

Gareth Gwenlan OBE (b. Brecon 26 April 1937 - d. Herts 8 May 2016), television producer and director, best known for his work on shows such as The Fall and Rise of Reginald Perrin, To the Manor Born, Only Fools and Horses.

Roger Glover (b. Brecon 30 November 1945), musician, best known as the bassist for hard rock bands Deep Purple and Rainbow.

Places of interest
Brecon Beacons and Brecon Beacons Mountain Centre, Libanus
Dan-yr-Ogof Caves, Glyntawe
Tretower Castle and Tretower Court
Y Gaer, Brecon Roman fort.
Bishop's Palace, Llanddew, favoured residence of Giraldus Cambrensis (Gerald of Wales)
Castell Du 
Bronllys Castle
Crickhowell castle
Waterfall Country
Henryd Falls
Prehistoric scheduled monuments in Brecknockshire
Roman-to-modern scheduled monuments in Brecknockshire
Y Gaer

See also
 List of Lord Lieutenants of Breconshire
 Custodes Rotulorum of Breconshire
 List of Sheriffs of Breconshire
 List of MPs for Breconshire

References
  Content in this article was copied from Brecknockshire at Wikishire, which is licensed under the Creative Commons Attribution-Share Alike 3.0 (Unported) (CC-BY-SA 3.0) license.

Further reading

External links
Map of Brecknockshire on Wikishire

 
Historic counties of Wales